This is a list of presidents of the Regional Council of Martinique:

At the end of 2015, the Regional Council and the General Councils (last President of the General Council of Martinique, Josette Manin) of Martinique were abolished and
replaced by the Assembly of Martinique.  The first president of this assembly was Alfred Marie-Jeanne, of the
MIM, elected 18 December 2015.

Sources
 World Statesmen.org

Politics of France
Politics of Martinique
Martinique